Ghassan Hasbani (born 30 August 1972) is a Lebanese businessman and politician. He has been Lebanon's Minister of Public Health and (simultaneously) Deputy Prime Minister from December 2016 to January 2020. Ghassan in an administrative and expert at the international level in planning, economics and technology.

2022 election
in 2022, Ghassan Hasbani won the Orthodox seat in Beirut I with 7080 votes.

CEO of STC International (2010–2012) 
He joined the Saudi Telecom Company (STC) from the global management consulting firm Booz & Company, where he led the firm's Middle East Communications and Technology practice and had been with the firm for 10 years.

Awards 
Outstanding CEO Award (2012)

References 

1972 births
Living people
Politicians from Beirut
Lebanese emigrants to the United Kingdom
British businesspeople
Lebanese Forces politicians
Greek Orthodox Christians from Lebanon
Health ministers of Lebanon
Alumni of the University of Westminster
Alumni of the University of Hull
Deputy prime ministers of Lebanon